Ancistrus megalostomus is a species of catfish in the family Loricariidae. It is native to South America, where it occurs in the Beni River basin, which is part of the Madeira River drainage in Bolivia. The species reaches 8.3 cm (3.3 inches) SL and is noted to inhabit high-altitude environments.

References 

megalostomus
Catfish of South America
Fish described in 1924